"Celibát" (in English "Celibacy")  is a single from the Katarze album of Czech pop music group Slza. The song was released on Spotify.

The video was directed by Vít Karas and was shot at Liblice Castle and featured Barbora Zelená - the final Czech Miss.

References 

Slza songs
2015 singles
2014 songs
Universal Music Group singles
Songs written by Xindl X